Swan Lake is a census-designated place and unincorporated community in Lake County, Montana, United States. Its population was 113 as of the 2010 census.

Geography
The Swan Lake CDP is in northeastern Lake County, on the east shore of the south end of the lake of the same name. The CDP extends east to the Lake County/Flathead County line, which runs along the crest of the Swan Range. The northern edge of the CDP follows Groom Creek, while the southern edge follows Bond Creek. Montana Highway 83 runs through the community close to the shore of Swan Lake; it leads northwest  to Montana Highway 35 north of Bigfork and south  to Montana Highway 200 at Clearwater.

Demographics

Notable person
Burke Riley, Alaska territorial and state official, was born in Swan Lake.

Notes

Census-designated places in Lake County, Montana
Census-designated places in Montana
Unincorporated communities in Montana
Unincorporated communities in Lake County, Montana